The FILA 1997 Professional Basketball season was the inaugural season of the Korean Basketball League.

Regular season

Playoffs

Prize money
Busan Kia Enterprise: KRW 150,000,000 (champions + regular-season 1st place)
Wonju Naray Blue Bird: KRW 70,000,000 (runners-up + regular-season 3rd place)
Anyang SBS Stars: KRW 30,000,000 (regular-season 2nd place)

External links
Official KBL website (Korean & English)

1996–97
1996–97 in South Korean basketball
1996–97 in Asian basketball leagues